Sthenognatha flinti is a moth in the family Erebidae. It was described by Todd in 1982. It is found in the Dominican Republic.

References

Moths described in 1982
Sthenognatha